Sardar Ahmad Nawaz Sukhera is a retired Pakistani civil servant who served in BPS-22 grade (highest attainable rank for a serving officer) as the Cabinet Secretary of Pakistan. Sukhera did his Bachelor's degree in Economics from the London School of Economics and obtained his Master's degree in Public Administration from Harvard University. Sukhera belongs to the Pakistan Administrative Service and joined the civil service in 1985.

Career
Sukhera served as the Cabinet Secretary of Pakistan, appointed by Prime Minister Imran Khan in April 2020 and retired from active civil service on 31 January 2023. He was previously serving as the Commerce Secretary of Pakistan. Earlier, he was serving as Secretary Board of Investment (BoI). Prior to BoI, he was the Information Secretary of Pakistan. 

Sukhera has also previously tenured as principal secretary to the Governor of Punjab and as deputy commissioner of Faisalabad.

See also
 Government of Pakistan

References

Year of birth missing (living people)
Living people
Pakistani civil servants
Government of Pakistan
Pakistani government officials
Alumni of the London School of Economics
Williams College alumni
Harvard Kennedy School alumni